Dania Enwer is a Pakistani television actress who works in Urdu television. She rose to prominence after playing a supporting role in ARY Digital's Habs. Besides acting, she also worked behind the camera as a costume designer.

Career 

Enwer made his debut in acting from Geo Entertainment's Heer. She first played the leading role in Fasih Bari Khan's written Faltu Larki alongside an ensemble cast of Hina Dilpazir, Samiya Mumtaz and Salman Shahid. After a setback due to stereotypical projects and portrayals, she then starred in series such as Adhuri Kahani, Badnaseeb and Sila-e-Mohabbat. In 2022, she played a supporting role in Six Sigma Plus' Habs alongside Ushna Shah, Feroze Khan and Saba Faisal, which earned her better recognition.

Filmography

Film

Television

References 

Living people
Pakistani television actresses
21st-century Pakistani actresses
Year of birth missing (living people)